The Hidden Pearls is a surviving 1918 American silent drama film directed by George Melford and starring Sessue Hayakawa. It was produced by Adolph Zukor and Jesse Lasky and distributed by Famous Players-Lasky and Paramount Pictures. The production was shot in Hawaii.

Cast

Preservation
The only known print of The Hidden Pearls is held by the French archive Centre national du cinéma et de l'image animée in Fort de Bois-d'Arcy.

See also
List of Paramount Pictures films

References

External links

1918 films
American silent feature films
Paramount Pictures films
Films directed by George Melford
American black-and-white films
Silent American drama films
1918 drama films
1910s American films